The 1929 Santa Barbara State Roadrunners football team represented Santa Barbara State during the 1929 college football season.

Santa Barbara State competed as an Independent in 1929 and 1930. They had been a member of the California Coast Conference (CCC) from 1927 to 1928, but that conference disbanded after the 1928 season. The 1929 Roadrunners were led by second-year head coach Harold Davis and played home games at Peabody Stadium in Santa Barbara, California. They finished the season with a record of four wins, four losses and one tie (4–4–1). Overall, the team outscored its opponents 87–64 for the season.

Schedule

Notes

References

Santa Barbara State
UC Santa Barbara Gauchos football seasons
Santa Barbara State Roadrunners football